RRS Bransfield was an ice-strengthened cargo vessel, purpose-built for the British Antarctic Survey (BAS).

History
RRS Bransfield was designed by consultants Graham & Woolnaugh of Liverpool for NERC, and built by Robb Caledon Shipbuilders Ltd, Leith.

She was the second vessel named after Edward Bransfield RN (1785-1852), who discovered the north west coast of the Antarctic Peninsula, roughly surveyed the South Shetland Islands, claiming King George Island and Clarence Island for Great Britain. Bransfield was the first man to chart part of the Antarctic mainland.

An earlier wooden Norwegian sealer, built in 1918 as Veslekari, was requisitioned by the Royal Navy in 1943 and renamed HMS Bransfield. She was the original expedition ship for Operation Tabarin, a secret British expedition to Antarctica during World War Two. Her service with Tabarin was inglorious - she proved to be unseaworthy, and was replaced before the expedition left English waters in November 1943.

In 1993/94, while in the Weddell Sea, RRS Bransfield suffered an engine room fire.

In May 1999, she was sold to GC Rieber Shipping as part of the contract for the long-term charter of her replacement, . She was subsequently renamed Igenpearl, and was scrapped in Mumbai in 2000.

Service
RRS Bransfield was BAS's main supply vessel for 29 years, from 1970/71 to 1998/99. She also had limited facilities for on-board research. There was a fully equipped hospital bay on board.

For much of her career her joint Masters were John Cole and Stewart Laurence. Bransfield represented NERC in the Review of the Fleet at Spithead in 1977, held to celebrate Queen Elizabeth II's silver jubilee.

References

External links 
 Photo of the ship http://www.sln.org.uk/wow/images/692.jpg

Icebreakers of the United Kingdom
Research vessels of the United Kingdom
1970 ships
Ships built in Leith
British Antarctic Survey